This article shows the rosters of all participating teams at the 2019 FIVB Volleyball Men's Challenger Cup in Slovenia.

Pool A

The following is the Chilean roster in the 2019 FIVB Volleyball Men's Challenger Cup.

Head coach: Daniel Nejamkin

The following is the Slovenian roster in the 2019 FIVB Volleyball Men's Challenger Cup.

Head coach: Alberto Giuliani

The following is the Turkish roster in the 2019 FIVB Volleyball Men's Challenger Cup.

Head coach: Nedim Özbey

Pool B

The following is the Belarusian roster in the 2019 Volleyball Men's Challenger Cup.

Head coach: Viktar Beksha

The following is the Cuban roster in the 2019 FIVB Volleyball Men's Challenger Cup.

Head coach: Nicolas Ernesto Vives Coffigny

The following is the Egyptian roster in the 2019 FIVB Volleyball Men's Challenger Cup.

Head coach: Gido Vermeulen

References

External links
2019 Challenger Cup – official website

FIVB Volleyball Men's Challenger Cup
FIVB
International volleyball competitions hosted by Slovenia
Sports competitions in Ljubljana
21st century in Ljubljana